Gen. John McCausland House, also known as "Grape Hill," is a historic home located near Pliny, Mason County, West Virginia.  The main house was built in 1885, and is a two-story sandstone residence.  It features a full-length, one story, five bay porch with fluted Doric order columns and metal covered hip roof.  The house was built by Confederate General John McCausland (1836–1927).  The boundary increase expanded the listing to include 23 additional contributing buildings and 4 contributing structures and designated it a national historic district.  They include a variety of farm-related outbuildings and a log house (c. 1834, 1930).

It was listed on the National Register of Historic Places in 1980 and the boundary expanded in 2000.

Beginning in 2015 a complete restoration project began to bring the historic site to its original condition.

See also
Smithland Farm

References

Houses on the National Register of Historic Places in West Virginia
Historic districts in Mason County, West Virginia
Houses completed in 1885
Houses in Mason County, West Virginia
Farms on the National Register of Historic Places in West Virginia
National Register of Historic Places in Mason County, West Virginia
Historic districts on the National Register of Historic Places in West Virginia
Log buildings and structures on the National Register of Historic Places in West Virginia